A general election was held in the U.S. state of New Jersey on November 2, 2021. Primary elections were held on June 8. All elected offices at the state level are on the ballot in this election cycle, including Governor and Lieutenant Governor for four-year terms, all 80 seats in the New Jersey General Assembly for two-year terms, and all 40 seats in the State Senate for four-year terms. In addition to the gubernatorial and State Legislative elections, numerous county offices and Freeholders in addition to municipal offices were up for election.

Governor

State Senate

All 40 seats of the New Jersey Senate were up for election.

General Assembly

All 80 seats of the New Jersey General Assembly were up for election.

References

 
New Jersey